"The Passenger" is a song written by Iggy Pop and Ricky Gardiner, recorded and released by Iggy Pop on the Lust for Life album in 1977. It was also released as the B-side of the album's only single, "Success". It was released as a single in its own right in March 1998, reaching number 22 in the UK charts.

Background and composition 
"The Passenger" was co-written by Iggy Pop and guitarist Ricky Gardiner; Pop wrote the lyrics, while Gardiner composed the music. Gardiner thought of the riff in early 1977 as he was wandering throughout the countryside, "in the field beside an orchard, on one of those glorious spring days with the trees in full blossom." The song was recorded at Hansa Studio by the Wall in West Berlin between May and June 1977. The lineup consisted of Pop, Gardiner, David Bowie on piano, Carlos Alomar on guitar, and brothers Tony and Hunt Sales on bass and drums, respectively. Bowie, Pop, and producer-engineer Colin Thurston produced Lust for Life under the pseudonym "Bewlay Bros.", named after the final track on Bowie's 1971 album Hunky Dory.

Similar to other tracks on Lust for Life, the lyrics for "The Passenger" were mostly composed on the spot in the studio. They were inspired by a Jim Morrison poem, titled "The Lords", that saw "modern life as a journey by car", as well as rides on the Berlin S-Bahn, according to Pop's former girlfriend Esther Friedmann. The lyrics have been interpreted as "Iggy's knowing commentary on Bowie's cultural vampirism". In an interview with The Guardian in 2016, Pop said "The Passenger" was partly inspired by touring with David Bowie: "I'd been riding around North America and Europe in David's car ad infinitum. I didn't have a driver's licence or a vehicle". Biographer Paul Trynka states that the song was "a simple celebration of life", of the "long walks" Pop would take growing up and his own reputation at the time. Tom Maginnis of AllMusic described the music as a "laid-back ... springy groove". Reviewers characterize the track as garage rock and proto-punk.

Release and reception
RCA Records issued Lust for Life on September 9, 1977, with "The Passenger" as the fourth track on side one of the original LP, between "Some Weird Sin" and "Tonight". The song was released as the B-side of "Success" in October 1977, but failed to chart. Pop's press officer Robin Eggar attempted to pursue RCA to issue "The Passenger" as an A-side, feeling it would be a hit, but he was ignored. Following its use in a car commercial two decades later, the song was released as an A-side by Virgin Records in March 1998 with "Lust for Life" and The Idiot track "Nightclubbing", with the catalog number 7243 8 94921 2 5. The single peaked at number 22 on the UK Singles Chart and remained on the chart for three weeks.

"The Passenger" has remained a mainstay of Pop's live performances. The song received an official music video in 2020, 43 years after its initial release.

"The Passenger" has appeared on several best-of lists. In a 2001 list compiling "the 100 Greatest Singles of the Post-Punk Era", the writers of Uncut magazine placed "The Passenger" at number 95. The staff of Billboard placed the song at number 78 in a list compiling "the 100 Greatest Car Songs of All Time" in 2016. The same year, Pitchfork ranked it the 95th best song of the 1970s. Benjamin Scheim wrote: "It's easy to listen to the intro and envision a million bands at home trying to figure out how to copy it." The song was also included in the 2008 book The Pitchfork 500. The aggregate website Acclaimed Music lists "The Passenger" as the 13th most acclaimed song of 1977, the 125th most acclaimed song of the 1970s, and the 590th most acclaimed song in history.

In media

The song has been featured in numerous movies, video games, documentaries and TV shows including He Died with a Felafel in His Hand, This Must Be the Place, Radiofreccia, 30 Days, Jarhead and the 2002 video game Mat Hoffman's Pro BMX 2. More recently, Up in the Air, The Weather Man, Kurt Cobain: About a Son, Scarface: The World Is Yours, 24 Hour Party People, If I Stay, Sons of Anarchy, War Dogs, Ash vs Evil Dead, 12 Monkeys,  Berlin Station, The Boys,  Dexter: New Blood, The Lincoln Lawyer and The Umbrella Academy in addition to advertisements for Dublin Bus, Captain Morgan, Kohl's "Simply Vera" collection, Guinness, the fifth season of Anthony Bourdain: Parts Unknown, and the film Waking Life.

In 2009, New Zealand broadband internet provider Orcon held a promotion where eight fans re-recorded the song via the internet. The recording featured instruments foreign to the original, such as a flute.
In 2010, the German mobile phone provider T-Mobile launched their "Welcome Home" flash-mob advert on British television. Amongst the songs performed using only voices was "The Passenger", sung by local Brighton resident George Ikediashi.
A cover of the song by The Phoenix Foundation was used in Tourism New Zealand's "One journey leads to another" campaign in 2017.
In 1995, a cover by Michael Hutchence of INXS was included on the Batman Forever soundtrack.

Personnel
According to Chris O'Leary and Thomas Jerome Seabrook:
Iggy Pop – lead vocals
David Bowie – piano, backing vocals
Ricky Gardiner – lead guitar
Carlos Alomar – rhythm guitar
Tony Sales - bass, backing vocals
Hunt Sales – drums, percussion, backing vocals

Production
Iggy Pop – producer
David Bowie – producer
Colin Thurston – producer, engineer

Certifications

Siouxsie and the Banshees version

English rock band Siouxsie and the Banshees covered "The Passenger" in 1987 for their all-cover-versions album Through the Looking Glass. The group revamped the song by adding brass arrangements. Released as the second single from the album, it peaked at number 41 in the UK.

Iggy Pop praised their version and stated: "That's good. She sings it well and she threw a little note in when she sings it, that I wish I had thought of, it's kind of improved it [...]. The horn thing is good." 

The song was featured at the end of the biographical film I, Tonya'' (2017).

"The Passenger (LaLaLa)" 

Lumix, D.T.E and Gabry Ponte released a cover of the song titled "The Passenger (LaLaLa)" on January 17, 2020, featuring Mokaby. The song charted across Europe.

Weekly charts

References

Sources

 

 

1977 singles
1987 singles
Batman (1989 film series)
Iggy Pop songs
Siouxsie and the Banshees songs
Songs written by Iggy Pop
Song recordings produced by David Bowie
1977 songs
American garage rock songs
Black-and-white music videos